Redding station (signed as West Redding) is a commuter rail stop on the Danbury Branch of the Metro-North Railroad New Haven Line, located in Redding, Connecticut. The station has one two-car-long high-level side platform to the west of the single track.

History
Redding station first opened as an original station on the Danbury and Norwalk Railroad in 1852. It was located on the west side of the track. A new structure serving as station, general store, and post office was later constructed on the east side of the tracks. It was replaced with a smaller concrete shelter slightly to the south in 1952; the older station remains standing and is used by local businesses. In 1999, Metro-North constructed a high-level platform and parking lot south of Long Ridge Road on the west side of the tracks.

References

External links

Connecticut Department of Transportation, "Condition Inspection Redding Station" report, August 2002

Stations along New York, New Haven and Hartford Railroad lines
Metro-North Railroad stations in Connecticut
Railroad stations in Fairfield County, Connecticut
Railway stations opened in 1852
1852 establishments in Connecticut